Gabriella Cecilia (born July 15, 2000) is an Indonesian TV presenter actress and modelling. She is a presenter in the "Esensi" infotainment program on BTV.

Career 
She debuted first Film is "Keira, Kisah Gadis dengan Tujuh Kepribadian" (English: Keira, the Story of a Girl with Seven Personalities)

Filmography

Movies

TV Presenter 
 Esesnsi - BTV
 Hot Kiss - Indosiar

Commercials 
 Biore (Kao Corporation)
 Zalora Model Cycle 3 (Global Fashion Group)
 Samsung Watch (Samsung Corporation)
 Bank BTN
 The Body Shop Indo
 Chocodrink (Wings Group)
 Banananina
 Joox 5th Anniversary (Tencent)
 XL Prioritas (Axiata)
 ESSE
 Veminime

References

External links 
 

2000 births
Living people
21st-century Indonesian actresses
People from Tangerang
Indonesian television presenters
Indonesian women television presenters
Indonesian actresses
Indonesian Christians
Indonesian Protestants